The Jirels is an ethnic Kirati group. Jirel are one of the 59 indigenous peoples in Nepal. They like to be called Jirpa, which means "leopard-like people." Sherpa (Shyar-pa), are the "people of the east, easterners". Jirpa believe that they migrated to Nepal, Jiri, and Dolakha from the western part of Nepal. Jiri, the name of the place, came from Jirpa. They are the original inhabitants of Jiri and its adjoining villages in Dolkha district, the central region of Nepal. They have their own distinct language, culture, customs, rituals and lifestyles. They are mostly Buddhist but many of the Jirel adhere to other religions, like Christianity, Islam and Hinduism. They also worship Jhakri (shamans). Their indigenous shamanistic religious beliefs are centered on practitioners called Phombo, who are believed to have a direct relationship with the supernatural world. Their main occupation is agriculture and animal husbandry. In recent years they have also been involved in business, government, and teaching jobs. Many of the Jirel are in the British Gurkha Army, Indian Army, Nepalese Army, and the police. They are primarily settled in Dolakha, Sindhupalchowk Chitwan, and Ilam districts, next to Likhu, Khimti, the Jiri and Jiri Shikri rivers. Jirels have linguistic and ethnic semblance with the Sherpas and the tribes of Central Tibet. Jirels have their own mother tongue which is called Jirpa Kecha, and belongs to the Tibetan language family.

Footnotes

References
 Maibaum, Anita and Esther Strahm. 2005. Jirel-Nepali-English. Kathmandu: Center for Nepal and Asian Studies, Tribhuvan University.

Ethnic groups in Nepal